The Crittenden Bridge, also known as the Chuckatuck Creek Bridge, is officially named The Sidney B. Hazelwood Sr. Bridge after a prominent member of the community.  This bridge is part of U.S. Route 17 and connects Suffolk, Virginia with Isle of Wight County.

History
The current bridge, opened in December 1988, replaced an earlier one built in 1928 by the James River Bridge Corporation as part of a three bridge system which included the original James River Bridge and the Nansemond River Bridge, each of which have also been replaced with newer structures.

References

Buildings and structures in Isle of Wight County, Virginia
Buildings and structures in Suffolk, Virginia
Transportation in Suffolk, Virginia
Transportation in Isle of Wight County, Virginia
Road bridges in Virginia
U.S. Route 17
Bridges of the United States Numbered Highway System